The 2008–09 Dallas Stars season was the 42nd season for the National Hockey League franchise that was established on June 5, 1967.
The Stars attempted to win the Stanley Cup for the second time in franchise history but the Stars would end the season missing the Stanley Cup playoffs for the first time since 2002.

Pre-season 
The Stars finished the pre-season with a 1-5-1 record.

Regular season 
The Stars finished the regular season having scored the fewest shorthanded goals in the NHL, with just two.

On February 6, 2009, the Stars defeated the New York Rangers at home by a score of 10–2. It was the first time that the Stars had scored 10 goals in a game since they defeated the San Jose Sharks at home by a score of 10–3 on November 28, 1992, when the franchise was still based in Minnesota.

On April 4, 2009, Trevor Daley scored just 16 seconds into the overtime period to give the Stars a 5–4 home win over the St. Louis Blues. It would prove to be the fastest overtime goal scored during the 2008–09 regular season.

Divisional standings

Conference standings

Schedule and results

Playoffs 
The Dallas Stars failed to qualify for the 2009 NHL playoffs. for the first time since 2002

Player statistics

Skaters

Goaltenders 

†Denotes player spent time with another team before joining Stars. Stats reflect player's season totals.
‡Traded mid-season
Bold/italics denotes franchise record

Awards and records

Milestones

Transactions

Trades 

 Condition not satisfied.

Free agents

Waivers

Retired

Draft picks 
The Stars' picks at the 2008 NHL Entry Draft in Ottawa, Ontario.

See also 
 2008–09 NHL season

Farm teams 
In 2008, the Stars ended their affiliation with the American Hockey League (AHL)'s Iowa Stars as their primary minor league affiliate, expecting to announce the formation of a new minor league expansion team, the Texas Stars, at the beginning of the 2009–10 season. The Texas Stars will be based in Cedar Park, Texas, just three hours driving time from the metroplex. The Stars' minor league contract players are currently dispersed among four different teams in the AHL and ECHL.

References 

Dallas Stars seasons
D
D